Minuscule 727 (in the Gregory-Aland numbering), Θε411 (von Soden), is a Greek minuscule manuscript of the New Testament written on parchment. Palaeographically it has been assigned to the 14th century. The manuscript is lacunose. Scrivener labelled it as 745e.

Description 

The codex contains the text of the four Gospels on 246 parchment leaves (size ), with some lacunae.
It lacks texts of Matthew 16:4-17:6.

The text is written in two columns per page, 50 lines per page.

There is no a division according to the smaller Ammonian Sections, no references to the Eusebian Canons.

Text 

The Greek text of the codex is a representative of the Byzantine text-type. Aland placed it in Category V.

It was not examined by using the Claremont Profile Method.

History 

Scrivener dated the manuscript to the 16th century, Gregory dated it to the 14th century. The manuscript is currently dated by the INTF to the 14th century.

The manuscript was added to the list of New Testament manuscripts by Scrivener (745) and Gregory (727). It was examined and described by Paulin Martin. Gregory saw the manuscript in 1885.

The manuscript is now housed at the Bibliothèque nationale de France (Gr. 179) in Paris.

See also 

 List of New Testament minuscules
 Biblical manuscript
 Textual criticism

References

Further reading 

 

Greek New Testament minuscules
14th-century biblical manuscripts
Bibliothèque nationale de France collections